Warren James Seals (born 12 February 1992) is a South African rugby union player, currently playing with English National League 1 side Darlington Mowden Park following his transfer from Yorkshire Carnegie for the 2017–18 season. His regular position is fly-half or inside centre.

Rugby career

Youth rugby

Seals was born in Sandton, but attended Kearsney College in KwaZulu-Natal. He was a member of the  team that played in the 2011 Under-19 Provincial Championship, scoring 48 points in his twelve appearances.

He played rugby for the Stellenbosch University, including making a single appearance in the 2013 Varsity Cup. He joined rivals  for the 2015 Varsity Cup, making eight starts and top-scoring for his team with 81 points, the third-highest in the competition.

Boland Cavaliers

Darlington Mowden Park

Seals then moved to England to join National League 1 side Darlington Mowden Park. He scored 115 points in 20 appearances for the team, helping them finish the 2015–16 season in sixth position.

Yorkshire Carnegie

He signed a one-year contract with RFU Championship side Yorkshire Carnegie for the 2016–17 season.

References

South African rugby union players
Living people
1992 births
Rugby union players from Johannesburg
Rugby union fly-halves
Rugby union centres
Boland Cavaliers players
Alumni of Kearsney College